The  is a Japanese school in Emmarentia, Johannesburg, South Africa.

History
The Nippon Club of South Africa (日本人会 Nihonjin-kai), a Johannesburg-based organisation, sponsors the school to encourage Japanese businesspeople to bring their families to Johannesburg. The club had been established in 1961 to assist Japanese companies operating in Johannesburg. It was responsible for the early development and promotion of the Japanese School of Johannesburg.

The Government of Japan financially subsidises the school, while the land used for the school was provided by the Government of South Africa. It opened in 1966. In its early days, up until around 1980, the school faced harassment and opposition from community residents. The school had to close its Saxonwold location because of a hostile campaign in 1968. It re-opened in February 1969 under restrictions including limiting the size of the student body to 30. In one suburb, the school was a frequent target of vandalism and racist graffiti.

The lawsuit Evans v Japanese School of Johannesburg was filed in 2006. The applicant said that she was told that when she turned 63 years of age, she was required to retire, and accused her job loss of being unfair.

References
 African Affairs, Volume 86. Royal African Society, 1987.
 Annual Survey of South African Law, 2006 (contributor: University of the Witwatersrand. Faculty of Law). Juta., 2006.
 Morikawa, Jun. Japan and Africa: Big Business and Diplomacy. Africa World Press, 1 January 1997. , 9780865435773.
 Osada, Masako. Sanctions and Honorary Whites: Diplomatic Policies and Economic Realities in Relations Between Japan and South Africa. Greenwood Publishing Group, 2002. , 9780313318771.
 Payne, Richard. "The nonsuperpowers and South Africa: implications for U.S. policy." Indiana University Press, 1990. , 9780253342942.
 Peace Studies (平和研究 Heiwa Kenkyū), Issue 10. The Peace Studies Association of Japan (日本平和学会 Nihon Heiwa Gakkai), 1985.

Notes

Further reading
 石川 勝美 (前ヨハネスブルグ日本人学校:沖縄県沖縄市立諸見小学校). "ヨハネスブルグ日本人学校校内の植物調査と活用(その他)." 在外教育施設における指導実践記録 33, 223–226, 2010-12-24. Tokyo Gakugei University. See profile at CiNii.

External links

  Japanese School of Johannesburg
  Japanese School of Johannesburg (Archive)

1966 establishments in South Africa
Educational institutions established in 1966
International schools in Johannesburg
Japanese international schools in Africa
Johannesburg
Japanese South African
Private schools in Gauteng
Japan–South Africa relations